Charly is an English unisex given name and nickname that is a diminutive form of Charles.

Given name

Charly Antolini (born 1937), Swiss jazz drummer
Charly Bouvy (1942 – 2003), Belgian bobsledder
Charly Dutournier (born 1994), French football player 
Charly Gaul (1932 – 2005), Luxembourgian cyclist
Charly Grosskost (1944 – 2004), French cyclist
Charly Loubet, (born 1945), French football player
Charly Luske (born 1978), Dutch singer, actor, television presenter and voice actor
Charly Martin (born 1984), American gridiron football player
Charly Moussono (born 1984), Cameroonian football player
Charly Mottet (born 1962), French cyclist
Charly Ollier (born 1985), French football player
Charly Runciman (born 1993),  Australian rugby player
Charly Suarez (born 1988), Filipino boxer

Nickname/Stagename

Charly Alberti stagename of Carlos Alberto Ficicchia Gigliotti (born 1963), Argentine musician
Charly B, stage name of Charles Blanvillain (born 1981), French singer-songwriter
Charly Bérard (born 1955), French cyclist
Charly Black, stagename of Desmond Méndez (born 1980), Jamaican singer
Charly Charrier (born 1986), French football player
Charly Chiarelli nickname of Calogero Chiarelli (born 1948), Canadian writer, storyteller, actor and musician
Charly Coombes, nickname of John Charles Coombes (born 1980 ), American-born English singer/songwriter, musician and filmmaker
Charly Dörfel, nickname of Gert Dörfel (born 1939), German football player
Charly Flores, nickname Juan Carlos Flores (born 1997),  American football player
Charly Galosi nickname of Carlos Javier Galosi (born 1975), Argentine ski mountaineer and mountain climber
Charly García (born Carlos Alberto García, 1951), Argentine singer-songwriter, musician and record producer
Charly Hertig nickname of Charles Hertig (1939 – 2012), Swiss football player and manager 
Charly Höllering, nickname of Charles H. Höllering (born Karl-Heinz Höllering, 1944 – 2009), German jazz musician
Charly Hübner nickname of Carsten Johannes Marcus Hübner (born 1972), German actor
Charly Konstantinidis nickname of Charalambos Konstantinidis (born 1985), Belgian football player
Charly Manson ring name of Jesús Luna Pozos (born 1975), Mexican luchador
Mini Charly Manson ring name of Arturo Santos Hernández (born 1987), Mexican Luchador and bodybuilder 
Charly McClain, stage name of Charlotte Denise McClain (born 1956), American singer
Charly Musonda (footballer, born 1969) nickname of Charles Musonda (born 1969), Zambian footballer
Charly Musonda (footballer, born 1996) nickname of Charles Musonda (born 1996), Belgian footballer
Charly "Carlos" Palmer (born 1960), American artist
Charly Wegelius, nickname of Charles Wegelius (born 1978), Finnish-born British cyclist

See also

Carly (name)
Chaly (surname)
Charl (name)
Charla (name)
Charley (disambiguation)
Charli (disambiguation)
Charlo (name)
Charls
Charly Barranger of Dirtyphonics
Charly Lownoise and Mental Theo
Charlye O. Farris
Charlyn
Charmy (disambiguation)
Charny (disambiguation)
Charyl
Sharly Mabussi

Notes

English feminine given names
English masculine given names